Eileen Sullivan-Marx is Dean of the New York University Rory Meyers College of Nursing, the Erline Perkins McGriff Professor of Nursing (since 2012) and president of the American Academy of Nursing since October 2019 (President-elect from 2017 until 2019).

Education
Sullivan-Marx earned a BSN in 1976 from the University of Pennsylvania, and an MS (1980) from the University of Rochester School of Nursing as a family health nurse practitioner and a PhD from the University of Pennsylvania School of Nursing in 1995.

Career
Sullivan-Marx was the associate dean for practice & community affairs at the University of Pennsylvania School of Nursing. For eleven years, she was the American Nurses Association representative (the first nurse to do so) to the American Medical Association’s Resource Based Relative Value Update Committee.

Awards

International Sigma Theta Tau Honor Society Best of Image Research Award (1993)
Hippensteel Founders Award for Excellence in Practice Award (2011)
Doris Schwartz Gerontological Nursing Research Award (2013)
VillageCare Award Distinguished Service Award in 2016.

Publications
Innovative collaborations: a case study for academic owned nursing practice
Directions for the Development of Nursing Knowledge

References

Living people
University of Pennsylvania School of Nursing alumni
American academic administrators
American women nurses
University of Rochester alumni
Year of birth missing (living people)
Place of birth missing (living people)
Nursing school deans
New York University faculty
American women academics
21st-century American women